The 2004 FINA Diving World Cup was held in Athens, Greece and was a qualifying event for 2004 Summer Olympics in Athens.

Medal winners

Men

Women

References
 Results

External links
 www.fina.org/

Fina Diving World Cup
FINA Diving World Cup
Fina Diving World Cup
Diving competitions in Greece
Sports competitions in Athens
International aquatics competitions hosted by Greece